Clinton is a city in and the county seat of Sampson County, North Carolina, United States. The population of Clinton is 8,639 according to the 2010 Census. Clinton is named for Richard Clinton, a Brigadier General of the North Carolina militia in the American Revolution.

History
The first settlers came to the Clinton area around 1740. The community was originally known as Clinton Courthouse. There was an earlier incorporated town of Clinton elsewhere in the state; however, that town folded in 1822 and Clinton was incorporated as a town in the same year. In 1852, the General Assembly passed several acts to improve regulation of towns, including Clinton. As part of the "Act for the Better Regulation of the Town of Clinton in the County of Sampson," the General Assembly appointed five commissioners: James Moseley, Isaac Boykin, Dr. Henry Bizzel, John Beaman, and Alfred Johnson. The corporate limits of the town at that time extended a half mile each way from the courthouse. The first records of an election were in February 1852 and the first tax rate was $0.50 per $100 valuation of real property. In July 1953, the town became a city.

Clinton is the geographic center of the county, and because Sampson County is primarily rural farmland, Clinton developed as the major agricultural marketing center. Clinton is also where future 13th Vice President William R. King, (1786-1853), later of Alabama,  under 14th President Franklin Pierce, (1804-1869), of New Hampshire, was born and began his legal career. He was inaugurated in March 1853 in Havana, Cuba, the only American executive official to be sworn in on foreign soil. He died shortly after being separately sworn in.

Clinton had a minor league baseball team in the Tobacco State League from 1946 to 1950, which was the last stop in the colorful career of Brooklyn Dodgers All-star pitcher Van Lingle Mungo.

The Bethune-Powell Buildings, Gen. Thomas Boykin House, Clinton Commercial Historic District, Clinton Depot, College Street Historic District, Graves-Stewart House, Robert Herring House, Johnson Building, Marcheston Killett Farm, Livingston Oates Farm, Patrick-Carr-Herring House, Pigford House, Pope House, Francis Pugh House, Pugh-Boykin House, Royal-Crumpler-Parker House, and West Main-North Chesnutt Streets Historic District are listed on the National Register of Historic Places.

Geography
Clinton is located at  (35.002418, -78.328803).

Climate

According to the Köppen Climate Classification system, Clinton has a humid subtropical climate, abbreviated "Cfa" on climate maps.

Demographics

2020 census

As of the 2020 United States census, there were 8,383 people, 3,213 households, and 1,826 families residing in the city.

2010 census
As of the census of 2010, there were 8,639 people, 3,392 households, and 2,068 families residing in the city. The population density was 1,114.7 people per square mile (430.4/km2). There were 3,711 housing units at an average density of 478.8 per square mile (184.9/km2). The racial makeup of the city was 48.9% White, 40.5% African American, 1.2% Native American, 1.1% Asian, 0.03% Pacific Islander, 6.1% from other races, and 2.2% from two or more races. Hispanic or Latino of any race were 9.2% of the population.

There were 3,392 households, out of which 25.3% had children under the age of 18 living with them, 36.4% were married couples living together, 20.5% had a female householder with no husband present, and 39.0% were non-families; 36.6% of all households were made up of individuals, and 18.1% had someone living alone who was 65 years of age or older. The average household size was 2.27 and the average family size was 2.95.

The age distribution of the city was 23.6% under the age of 20, 23.8% from 20 to 39, 32.1% from 40 to 64, and 21.5% age 65 years or older. The median age was 42.1 years. For every 100 females, there were 90.4 males. For every 100 females age 18 and over, there were 86.1 males.

According to the US Census 2013 Community Survey, the median household income in the city is $32,927, and the median family income is $52,100. The per capita income for the city is $24,119. About 20.2% of families and 27.8% of the population were below the poverty line, including 43.2% of those under age 18 and 18.9% of those age 65 or over.

Notable people 
 Sam Aiken - former NFL player
 Rube Benton - baseball pitcher
 Ronnie Dixon - former NFL Player
 Lauch Faircloth - U.S. Senator (R-NC) 1993–99
 Gwendolyn Faison - former Mayor of Camden, New Jersey (2000-2010)
 Pearl Fryar - topiary artist
 Nelson Z. Graves - businessman
 Leonard Henry - former NFL player 
 Terry Holland - basketball head coach University of Virginia, athletic director East Carolina University
 William Rufus DeVane King - 13th Vice President of the United States
 Jerris McPhail - former NFL player 
 Dennis Owens - former NFL player
 Willie Parker - former NFL player
 "Jimmy" Raynor - former MLB player (Dodgers)
 Curtis Smith - World Champion and Hall of Fame Drag Racer

References

External links
 City website
 Downtown Clinton, NC website
 Clinton-Sampson Chamber of Commerce
 Clinton City Schools

Cities in Sampson County, North Carolina
County seats in North Carolina
Populated places established in 1740
1740 establishments in North Carolina